Linzer is a surname. Notable people with the surname include:

Anna Linzer, American novelist and non-profit management consultant
Dafna Linzer (born 1970), American journalist
Daniel I. Linzer (born 1954), American molecular biologist and academic administrator
Dov Linzer (born 1966), American Open Orthodox rabbi
Drew Linzer, American professor of political science from Emory University
Michael Linzer (born 1989), Austrian professional tennis player
Sandy Linzer (born 1941), American songwriter, lyricist, and record producer

See also
Linz, the third-largest city of Austria
Linzer Aach, river in Linzgau, Baden-Württemberg, Germany
Linzer Klangwolke, open-air annual multimedia musical event in Linz
Linzer Landestheater, a theatre in Linz, Austria
Linzer torte, an Austrian torte with a lattice design on top of the pastry
Linzer Orgeltabulatur, emblematic organ tablature of the early baroque era
Linzer Sanden, geologic formation in Austria
Linzer Stadion, multi-purpose stadium, in Linz, Austria

German-language surnames